The Glossa Ordinaria, which is Latin for "Ordinary [i.e. in a standard form] Gloss", is a collection of biblical commentaries in the form of glosses. The glosses are drawn mostly from the Church Fathers, but the text was arranged by scholars during the twelfth century. The Gloss is called "ordinary" to distinguish it from other gloss commentaries. In origin, it is not a single coherent work, but a collection of independent commentaries which were revised over time. The Glossa ordinaria was a standard reference work into the Early Modern period, although it was supplemented by the Postills attributed to Hugh of St Cher and the commentaries of Nicholas of Lyra.

Composition
Before the 20th century, this Glossa ordinaria was misattributed to Walafrid Strabo. The main impetus for the composition of the gloss came from the school of Anselm of Laon (d. 1117) and his brother Ralph. Another scholar associated with Auxerre, Gilbert the Universal (d. 1134), is sometimes credited with the Gloss on much of the Old Testament, although only the gloss on Lamentations has been firmly attributed to him. The Gloss achieved a more-or-less standard form at Paris in the second half of the twelfth century.

Editions
The Patrologia Latina, volumes 113 and 114, contain a version of the glossa which, as well as being misattributed to Strabo, represents a later manuscript tradition. There is currently available a facsimile of the first printed edition of a glossa, which was published at Strasbourg in 1480/1 which can be found here. There are now modern editions of the following books: Genesis (chps 1-3); Lamentations (prothemes and ch 1); Ecclesiastes; Song of Songs; the Epistles of John; the Book of Revelation ; and others.

Other works 
It is a parallel tradition to the Jewish Mikraot Gedolot.

Many important works would also have their own glossa ordinaria, such as that of Accursius for Justinian's Corpus or that of Johannes Teutonicus Zemeke and Bartholomew of Brescia of Gratian.<ref>Baldwin, John W., The Scholastic Culture of the Middle Ages, 1000-1300, pp. 72-73 </ref>

References

Further reading

Froehlich, Karlfried (2010). Biblical Interpretation from the Church Fathers to the Reformation (Variorum Collected Studies Series; CS951; Farnham, Surrey, England; Burlington, VT: Ashgate, 2010) [seven essays on the Glossa ordinaria]. ISBN 9781409403654. 

Litteral, John (editor) and Van Der Pas, Sarah (translator) (2014). The Glossa Ordinaria, Epistles of St. John. Ancient Bible Commentaries in English. Litteral's Christian Library Publications. .
Van Der Pas, Sarah (2015). The Glossa Ordinaria on Revelation: an English Translation. Consolamini Commentary Series. .
Schoenfeld, Devorah (2012). Isaac on Jewish and Christian Altars: Polemic and Exegesis in Rashi and the Glossa Ordinaria, New York: Fordham University Press. .

Zier, Mark (1997). “Peter Lombard and the Glossa ordinaria on the Bible”. In J. Brown and W.P. Stoneman (eds.). A Distinct Voice: Medieval Studies in honor of Leonard E. Boyle. O.P. Notre Dame: University of Notre Dame Press, pp. 629-641. .
Zier, Mark (2004). “The Development of the Glossa Ordinaria to the Bible in the Thirteenth Century: The Evidence from the Bibliothèque Nationale, Paris”. In G. Cremascoli and F. Santi (eds.). La Bibbia de XIII Secolo: Storia del Testo, Storia dell’Esegesi. Florence: Sismel - Edizioni del Galluzzo. pp. 155-184. .
Zier, Mark (2007). “Peter Lombard and the Glossa Ordinaria: A Missing Link?” In Pietro Lombardo. Atti del XLIII Convegno storico internazionale. Todi, 8-10 ottobre 2006. Spoleto: Fondazione Centro italiano di Studi sull'alto medioevo. pp. 361-409. .

External links
 Complete glossa ordinaria at http://gloss-e.irht.cnrs.fr/php/livres-liste.php
Catholic Encyclopedia: Scriptural Glosses
"A Handlist of Medieval Manuscripts of the Glossa Ordinaria" with links to online catalogues and digitized manuscripts where availableGlossa ordinaria, ed. Migne, Google Books facsimile:  vol. 1, vol. 2Glossa ordinaria via VulSearch ! This version of the Glossa is incomplete and is not representative of the medieval text. It is not suitable for scientific work. 
Website providing resources about the Glossa Ordinaria'' and other glosses to the Bible: Glossae.net

Religious books
Christian terminology